De Grote Molen is a smock mill in Marrum, Friesland, Netherlands which was built in 1845. The mill has been restored to working order. It is listed as a Rijksmonument, number 15637.

History

De Grote Molen was built by millwright J T Kingma of Ternaard in 1845 to drain the  Marrum-Westernijtjerk polder. As built, the mill was fitted with Patent sails. Later, Common sails fitted with streamlined leading edges on the Dekker System were fitted. These were later replaced by Common sails with leading edges on the Fok System.

The mill was restored in 1957-58, 1965, and again in 1968. On 4 May 1976, the mill was sold to Stichting De Fryske Mole. A further restoration was undertaken in 1978-78. Auxiliary power is from an EMF Dordt electric motor.

Description

De Grote Molen is what the Dutch describe as a Grondzeiler. It is a two-storey smock mill on a single-storey base. There is no stage, the sails reaching almost to ground level. The mill is winded by tailpole and winch. The smock and cap are thatched. The sails are Common sails, fitted with leading edges on the Fok system. The sails are carried on a cast-iron windshaft. which was cast by Prins van Oranje, The Hague, South Holland in 1868. The windshaft also carries the brake wheel which has 65 cogs. This drives the wallower (33 cogs) at  the top of the upright shaft. At the bottom of the upright shaft the crown wheel, which has 49 cogs drives a gearwheel with 45 cogs on the axle of the Archimedes' screw. The axle of the Archimedes' screw is  diameter. It is inclined at 19°. Each revolution of the screw lifts  of water.

Public access
De Grote Molen is open to the public by appointment.

References

External links
 

Windmills in Friesland
Windmills completed in 1845
Smock mills in the Netherlands
Windpumps in the Netherlands
Rijksmonuments in Friesland
Octagonal buildings in the Netherlands